Diego Iori (born May 20, 1986) is an Italian professional ice hockey player who is currently playing for the HC Fassa of the Serie A. Iori competed in the 2012 IIHF World Championship as a member of the Italy men's national ice hockey team.

References

External links

1986 births
Living people
Italian ice hockey forwards